Safiabad (also Romanized as Safīābād) is a city in Bam and Safiabad District, in Esfarayen County, North Khorasan Province of Iran.  At the 2006 census its population was 3,047, in 885 families.

References

Populated places in Esfarayen County
Cities in North Khorasan Province